Kulakkada is a village in Kollam district in the state of Kerala, India.

Kulakkada is also a panchayath headquartered in Mavadi.
The main towns in kulakkada panchayath are Kulakkada, Puthoor and Poovattoor.
The Thiruvananthapuram–Angamaly M.C. road passes through Kulakkada. This village situated at bank of kallada river

Demographics
 India census, Kulakkada had a population of 14874 with 7194 males and 7680 females.

Schools and colleges
G V H S S Kulakkada (Govt. vocational higher secondary School, Kulakkada)
G L P S Kulakkada  (Govt. Lower Primary School, Kulakkada)
BEd. College, Kulakkada (K U C T E Kerala University College of Teacher Education)
D.V.U.P. School, Thazhathu Kulakkada
Devi Vilasom Lower Primary School Thazhathu kulakkada.
G.W.L.P.S, KUTTARA

Church
CGI Kulakkada (Church of God(Full Gospel) in India), Thiruthilambalam)
St Thomas Mar Thomas Church, Malappara
St Gregorious Orthodox Church, EarthuKulakkada
St George Orthodox Valiyapally, Thuruthilambalam
Evangelical church, Thuruthilambalam

References

Villages in Kollam district